Lee Hyung-Sang or simply Lio (born 6 May 1985) is a South Korean football player.

Lee Hyung-Sang is an attacking midfielder, the winger type. His main advantages are his exceptional speed and maneuverability. He has good dribble and precise passing.

Career
Lio start his professional career in Ulsan Hyundai, after which he plays for the elite Daejeon Citizen for four years. He played only 1 games in league cup. In 2007, he left for Europe and signed a contract with the Portuguese club S.C. Beira-Mar. After six months there, Lio was sold to C.D. Feirense. While there, the scouts of the Bulgarian Spartak Varna liked him and during the summer of 2008 he went to Bulgaria. In Spartak the Korean football player quickly becomes the favorite of the fans. Unfortunately, in the last friendly match of Spartak before the beginning of the Bulgarian championship Lio broke his arm and because of the fracture he did not play for about a month. In 2009, he returned to K-League by signing a contract with Seongnam Ilhwa Chunma.

In 2009, he signed a 3-year contract with Baník Ostrava making himself the first non-European player to ever play for the club. His first appearance for Baník Ostrava came on 8 August 2009, during a 1–0 win over Viktoria Plzeň by substitute on 90 minute.

On 4 January 2011, Lee joined Daegu FC. He made his Daegu FC debut in a 0–2 League Cup loss over Gyeongnam FC on 16 March 2011.

References

External links 

 Lee's profile at lpfp.pt 

1985 births
Living people
People from Pohang
South Korean footballers
South Korean expatriate footballers
Association football forwards
Ulsan Hyundai FC players
Daejeon Hana Citizen FC players
S.C. Beira-Mar players
C.D. Feirense players
PFC Spartak Varna players
Seongnam FC players
FC Baník Ostrava players
HNK Šibenik players
Daegu FC players
Gangneung City FC players
K League 1 players
Czech First League players
First Professional Football League (Bulgaria) players
Korea National League players
Expatriate footballers in Portugal
Expatriate footballers in Bulgaria
Expatriate footballers in the Czech Republic
Expatriate footballers in Croatia
South Korean expatriate sportspeople in Portugal
South Korean expatriate sportspeople in Bulgaria
South Korean expatriate sportspeople in the Czech Republic
South Korean expatriate sportspeople in Croatia
Sportspeople from North Gyeongsang Province